Munch Mobile is a top-down driving game released in arcades in 1983. Developed by SNK, it was licensed to Centuri for the US release. SNK published the game in Japan as Joyful Road. The player controls an anthropomorphic car that uses extending arms to grab items from alongside the road. In 1984, Texas Instruments published a port for its TI-99/4A home computer.

Gameplay
The game is viewed in the top-down perspective and automatically scrolls forward. The goal is to reach the garage at the far end of the road. The player drives a car with a large hand attached that is used to collect objects along the road. The left 8-way stick controls the car, the right two-way  stick controls the hands. Fruits give points and gas containers give more fuel. Players gain extra points by disposing of the inedible remains of fruit in trash cans. Trees and other obstacles injure the hand, making it temporarily unusable. Player lives are lost when players run out of fuel or hit other cars.

References

1983 video games
Arcade video games
Racing video games
SNK games
TI-99/4A games
Top-down racing video games
Video games developed in Japan
Texas Instruments games